The Plymouth Antiquarian House (also known as Hedge House or "Hammatt House") is an historic house museum in Plymouth, Massachusetts owned by the Plymouth Antiquarian Society.

The house was built in 1809 for William Hammatt, a New England sea captain. The Hedges, a family of entrepreneurs, purchased the house in 1830 and lived there until 1919. The house was originally located on Court Street but was moved to Water Street by the Antiquarian Society in 1919.  It is open during the summer months. The house was added to the National Register of Historic Places in 1974.

See also
National Register of Historic Places listings in Plymouth County, Massachusetts

References

External links
Plymouth Antiquarian Society: Historic Houses - includes Hedge House

Houses completed in 1809
Historic house museums in Massachusetts
Museums in Plymouth, Massachusetts
Houses in Plymouth, Massachusetts
National Register of Historic Places in Plymouth County, Massachusetts
Houses on the National Register of Historic Places in Plymouth County, Massachusetts
Federal architecture in Massachusetts